Giriraja Kavi was a noted composer of Carnatic music, who lived in the 18th century in the kingdom of Thanjavur. His hometown, Tiruvarur, lies in the present-day state of Tamil Nadu.

Born into a pious but impoverished family belonging to the Mulukanadu sub-caste, Giriraja Kavi rose to occupy a place of eminence in the court of the Maharaja of Thanjavur, which in that era was a fountainhead of cultural talent. The great trinity of Carnatic music, Tyagaraja, Shyama Shastri and Muthuswami Dikshitar were all born in this area in the latter half of 18th century. Giriraja Kavi was among those who nurtured the cultural environment that produced these greats.

Giriraja was born in Kakarla village, Cumbum taluk in present-day Prakasam district, Andhra Pradesh. Giriraja  has produced many of the important cultural figures of South India. Among the greatest of those was Tyagaraja, whose mother was a daughter of Giriraja Kavi. He was named after the presiding deity of the main temple of that town. Giriraja Kavi played a major role in influencing the formative years of his celebrated grandson Tyagaraja. He was instrumental in securing a place at court for his grandson, a position that Tyagaraja soon abjured.

It is to Tyagaraja's credit that Giriraja Kavi's musical work, created during an era that was dominated by the trinity of Carnatic music, has secured him a lasting place of honour among the greats of Carnatic music.

Carnatic composers
Musicians from Andhra Pradesh
Telugu people
People from Prakasam district
18th-century Indian composers